Burnt Store Marina is an unincorporated community and census-designated place (CDP) in Lee County, Florida, United States. The population was 1,890 at the 2020 census, up from 1,793 at the 2010 census. It is part of the Cape Coral-Fort Myers, Florida Metropolitan Statistical Area.

Geography
Burnt Store Marina is located in northwestern Lee County at  (26.766473, -82.051327). It is bordered to the south by the city of Cape Coral and to the north by Charlotte County. The west side of the community fronts on Charlotte Harbor, and the east side follows Burnt Store Road.

Demographics

As of the census of 2000, there were 1,271 people, 672 households, and 534 families residing in the CDP. The racial makeup of the CDP was 98.51% White, 0.94% African American, 0.08% Native American, 0.16% Asian, and 0.31% from two or more races. Hispanic or Latino of any race were 0.94% of the population.

There were 672 households, out of which 2.1% had children under the age of 18 living with them, 78.3% were married couples living together, 0.7% had a female householder with no husband present, and 20.4% were non-families. 17.9% of all households were made up of individuals, and 11.3% had someone living alone who was 65 years of age or older.  The average household size was 1.89 and the average family size was 2.09.

In the CDP, the population was spread out, with 1.9% under the age of 18, 0.6% from 18 to 24, 4.2% from 25 to 44, 51.5% from 45 to 64, and 41.8% who were 65 years of age or older.  The median age was 63 years. For every 100 females, there were 97.7 males.  For every 100 females age 18 and over, there were 97.6 males.

The median income for a household in the CDP was $61,786, and the median income for a family was $68,542. Males had a median income of $31,750 versus $17,163 for females. The per capita income for the CDP was $46,050.  About 3.4% of families and 3.6% of the population were below the poverty line, including none of those under the age of eighteen or over sixty-five.

References

Census-designated places in Lee County, Florida
Census-designated places in Florida
Populated places on Charlotte Harbor